The Southland Conference, abbreviated as SLC, is a collegiate athletic conference which operates in the South Central United States (specifically Texas and Louisiana). It participates in the NCAA's Division I for all sports; for football, it participates in the Division I Football Championship Subdivision (FCS).  The Southland sponsors 18 sports, 10 for women and eight for men, and is governed by a presidential Board of Directors and an Advisory Council of athletic and academic administrators.  Chris Grant became the Southland's seventh commissioner on April 5, 2022. From 1996 to 2002, for football only, the Southland Conference was known as the Southland Football League. 
    
The conference's offices are located in the Dallas suburb of Frisco, Texas. According to a press release from April 11, 2022, the conference was to undergo a rebrand in 2022 that included a new name and logo. The rebranding was unveiled in March 2023, with a new logo but no change to the conference name.

History

Chronological timeline

Founded in 1963, its members were Abilene Christian College (now Abilene Christian University; departed in 1973 for NCAA Division II, but moved to Division I and rejoined the Southland in 2013), Arkansas State College (now Arkansas State University; departed in 1987, now a member of the Sun Belt Conference), Arlington State College (now The University of Texas at Arlington, departed in 2012 and now in the Western Athletic Conference), Lamar State College of Technology (now Lamar University; departed in 1987, but re-joined in 1999), and Trinity University (departed in 1972, now participating in NCAA Division III).

Since its founding, the Southland Conference has been the home for 18 college and university all-sports programs (see membership timeline below). In addition, the conference has also been home to some schools for one sport only. In the case of football, Troy University fielded a team from 1996 to 2000 and Jacksonville State University did so from 1997 to 2002. This has also been the case for some Olympic sports like men's tennis, in which the University of Texas–Pan American (UTPA) and the University of New Orleans (UNO) fielded teams as affiliate members before 2013, when UTPA joined the WAC and UNO became a full Southland member.

The Southland underwent major turmoil in 2021, losing five members. On January 14, the Western Athletic Conference (WAC) announced that four Southland members—Abilene Christian, Lamar, Sam Houston, and Stephen F. Austin—would join that conference in July 2022. Within a week, the Southland expelled those four schools, leading the WAC to move their entry up to July 2021. A fifth member, Central Arkansas, announced on January 29 that it would join the ASUN Conference effective that July. At the time, the ASUN was a non-football conference, but soon entered into a football partnership with the WAC that gave Central Arkansas and two other incoming ASUN members a football home until an ASUN football league was established.

The Southland began the process of rebuilding its core membership in September 2021, announcing that Texas A&M University–Commerce would start a transition from NCAA Division II and join the conference in July 2022. The SLC also announced a football scheduling alliance with the Ohio Valley Conference, another FCS league that had experienced major membership losses during the 2021–22 realignment cycle, for the 2022 and 2023 seasons. However, shortly after A&M–Commerce was announced as a future member, the SLC was set to experience further attrition when the University of the Incarnate Word (UIW) announced that it would leave for the WAC after the 2021–22 school year. Ultimately, however, this did not come to pass, as UIW announced it would be staying in the SLC only 7 months after announcing its departure. McNeese was also courted by the WAC, and also flirted with a move to Conference USA, but eventually stayed in the SLC. According to the American Press, the daily newspaper of McNeese's home of Lake Charles, Louisiana, McNeese became "the de facto lead school in the league". It will host the SLC's football media day through at least the 2026 season, as well as the conference tournaments in men's and women's basketball, baseball, and softball through 2026.

More recently, Lamar announced it would return to the SLC effective in 2023–24. In addition, on April 11, 2022 the conference announced in a press release that it had partnered with Troika Media Group to institute a rebrand to be implemented before the end of the calendar year. The release stated that the rebrand would include, among other things, a new name for the conference. On July 11, 2022, Lamar and the Southland Conference announced Lamar's accelerated return to the SLC effective immediately. The following day saw the SLC lose two of its women's golf associates when the Mid-Eastern Athletic Conference (MEAC) and Northeast Conference (NEC) announced a partnership for baseball and men's and women's golf that saw all MEAC schools that sponsored those sports become NEC associates. Accordingly, Delaware State and Maryland Eastern Shore, which had joined SLC women's golf just a year earlier, moved that sport to the NEC.

Member schools

Current members

Associate members
The Southland added four associate members in golf effective with the 2021–22 school year. One school joined in men's golf only, two in women's golf only, and one in both. A fifth school joined at the same time for both men's and women's tennis, and two more schools joined in July 2022, one for men's and women's golf and tennis and the other for beach volleyball. However, as noted previously, two of these schools left a year later when their full-time home of the Mid-Eastern Athletic Conference entered into a women's golf partnership with the Northeast Conference.  The Southland Conference announced UIC joining the conference as an affiliate in men's tennis for the 2022–23 season on July 14.  San Jose State was added as a multi-year beach volleyball affiliate beginning with the 2023 season (2022–23 school year).

Former members
School names and nicknames listed here reflect those in use in each institution's final school year of Southland Conference membership.

Notes

Former associate members

Notes

Membership timeline
  

1. - Southwestern Louisiana became the University of Louisiana at Lafayette (Louisiana–Lafayette, now athletically branded as simply Louisiana) in 1999.
2. - Northeast Louisiana became the University of Louisiana at Monroe (Louisiana–Monroe) in 1999.

Sports
The Southland Conference sponsors championship competition in eight men's and 10 women's NCAA sanctioned sports. The most recently added sport is beach volleyball, with SLC competition starting in 2019–20.

Men's sponsored sports by school

Men's varsity sports not sponsored by the Southland Conference which are played by SLC schools:

Women's sponsored sports by school

Women's varsity sports not sponsored by the Southland Conference which are played by SLC schools:

Football
Former and current players from the Southland that would go on to star in the National Football League include Gary Barbaro, Mike Barber, Fred Barnett, Bill Bergey, Derrick Blaylock, Bubby Brister, Ray Brown, Roger Carr, Mark Carrier, Larry Centers, Bruce Collie, Keith Davis, Fred Dean, Jackie Harris, Stan Humphries, Buford Jordan, Wade Key, Josh McCown, Tim McKyer, Jeff Novak, Kavika Pittman, Mike Quinn, Billy Ryckman, Ricky Sanders, Eugene Seale, Rafael Septién, Terrance Shaw, Marcus Spears, Chad Stanley, Pat Tilley, Jeremiah Trotter, Marvin Upshaw, Lardarius Webb and Spergon Wynn. The Southland was instrumental in founding the Independence Bowl, and the Southland champion served as the automatic home team for that bowl from 1976–1980. On May 21, 2014, the Southland Conference approved the use of instant replay at all its home games becoming the first FCS league to fully commit to having all games utilize instant replay.

Men's basketball
Among notable NBA stars attending Southland Conference schools include Karl Malone (Louisiana Tech), Joe Dumars (McNeese), Jeff Foster (Southwest Texas State, now known as Texas State),  and Andrew Toney (Southwestern Louisiana, now known as Louisiana).

Women's basketball
Former member Louisiana–Monroe (then Northeast Louisiana) advanced to the 1985 NCAA Women's Final Four.

Championships
Southland Conference men's basketball tournament
Southland Conference women's basketball tournament
Southland Conference baseball tournament
Southland Conference women's soccer tournament
Southland Conference softball tournament

Spending and revenue

Total revenue includes ticket sales, contributions and donations, rights/licensing, student fees, school funds and all other sources including TV income, camp income, food and novelties. Total expenses includes coaching/staff, scholarships, buildings/ground, maintenance, utilities and rental fees and all other costs including recruiting, team travel, equipment and uniforms, conference dues and insurance costs.

Facilities

Notes: 
 Texas A&M–Corpus Christi uses off-campus Whataburger Field as their home field for some high-profile games and some tournaments.

Media

Southland Conference Television Network
The Conference began its own syndicated broadcast entity in 2008, the Southland Conference Television Network. It aired in over 25 markets in the league's four-state region, plus on national networks such as Fox College Sports, ESPN GamePlan, and ESPN3.  In 2008-09, the network featured 35 broadcasts, and over 30 in each of the next four seasons.

For 2013 and 2014, the syndicated network was restricted to only regular season football games. The remainder of the schedule was available on ESPN3 or regional sports networks, including regular season and tournament basketball as well as championships in soccer, volleyball, softball and baseball. ESPN3 also carried an exclusive package of football games beyond the syndicated network's schedule.

SLCTV dissolved on July 1, 2015. Beginning with the 2015–16 school year, the Southland Conference entered into an agreement with the American Sports Network to syndicate and televise selected games, while also continuing its association with ESPN3. A separate deal will allow for Louisiana-based Cox Sports Television to air select games.

After ASN folded following the 2016–17 academic year, the Southland announced a television agreement with Eleven Sports. During 2017-18, conference-controlled games aired on ESPN3, Eleven Sports, Fox Sports Southwest and Cox Sports Television. For 2018-19, ESPN productions began to be split between ESPN3 and ESPN+ platforms.  On October 8, 2020, the Southland Conference announced a multi-year extension through the 2024–25 academic year as well as an expansion of its media rights agreement with ESPN.

Academics

See also
List of American collegiate athletic stadiums and arenas

References

External links
 

 
Sports organizations established in 1963
Sports in the Southern United States
College sports in Louisiana
College sports in Texas
Articles which contain graphical timelines